Miss Dominican Republic 2019 was held on 18 August 2019 at Teatro Nacional in Santo Domingo. The competition was hosted by Juan Carlos Pichardo and Zuleyka Rivera, and was broadcast on Color Visión. Clauvid Dály of Punta Cana was crowned as the winner at the end of the event.

Dály represented the Dominican Republic at Miss Universe 2019 and placed in the top twenty, Franchesca Ástier competed at Reina Hispanoamericana 2019, and Kimberly Jiménez was appointed as Miss Dominican Republic 2020 and competed at Miss Universe 2020, placing as the fourth runner-up.

Results

Placements
Color keys

Special awards

Contestants

Miss Dominican Republic 2020 
Due to the COVID-19 pandemic, the event organization had to get cancelled and the first runner up from the previous contest was crowned Miss Dominican Republic 2020, Kímberly Jiménez from the La Romana Province.

References

External links

Miss Dominican Republic
2019 in the Dominican Republic
2019 beauty pageants